Hamilton High School is a public high school in Lisbon, Wisconsin that serves multiple southeastern Wisconsin communities. Hamilton High School is part of the Hamilton School District.

It serves all of and Butler, most of Lannon and Sussex, parts of Lisbon and Menomonee Falls, and a small part of Pewaukee.

History
The school was completed in 1962. It was named for Alexander Hamilton, a signer of the Constitution. It opened for freshman and sophomores assigned to the new high school from surrounding areas such as Pewaukee, Hartland, Merton, Germantown, Menomonee Falls, Brookfield, Wauwatosa, Butler, and Waukesha. A class was added each year until the first senior class graduated in 1965.

In 1970, new classrooms were added; in 1996, a science wing was added; in 2004, the 35,000-square-foot Hamilton Fine Arts Center was added. In 2006, a federal grant funded a fitness center with over 35 machines. In 2008, the gym was redone with new bleachers, and the floor was refurbished. In 2012, a video scoreboard was added. In 2014 an indoor training facility was finished, and in 2016, a wing was added to relocate the history classrooms and reorganize the rest of the classrooms.

Fine Arts Center
The  Hamilton Fine Arts Center seats 750 people. It contains a full-fly stage, orchestra pit for live musical accompaniment, ticket booth, dressing rooms, new music rooms, costume-prop storage, control booth area, and art display area.

Curriculum
Hamilton High School offers honors classes and AP courses. Many departments also have connections with area businesses, providing students the opportunity to participate in co-operative learning experiences. For credit-deficient students, the P.A.S.S. and G.A.P. individualized course programs are offered. The school is accredited by AdvancED.

Graphic arts
Students can work with screen printing and offset printing. The graphics lab has two single-color offset presses, one digital two-color press, two darkrooms, a camera, a straight to film printer, and a guillotine paper cutter.

Extracurricular activities

FIRST Robotics
Hamilton's FIRST Robotics Competition team is known as "Charger Robotics" and "Team 537". Team 537 is composed of four component design teams. The mechanical team builds the mechanical pieces of the robot, such as the chassis and drive train, The electrical team wires the electrical parts together, and the code team programs the internal computer that interprets the signals from the controller. The marketing team raises funds and performs publicity activities. The course team builds the full-size course used at the annual mini-regional, and the animation team designs and creates the team animation, the topic of which is released at the same time as the robot task. Sponsors include Rockwell Automation and GE.

Team 537 won the St. Louis Regional in 2004 and 2017, the Motorola Regional in 2005, and the Milwaukee Regional in 2006. The team mentors four local middle school FIRST LEGO League teams. They have won the Regional Chairman's Award six times (in 2010, 2012, 2013, 2015, 2016, and 2017), and the Engineering Inspiration Award in 2011.

Instrumental music
The Hamilton High School band program consists of a wind symphony (primarily juniors/seniors), a symphonic band (primarily freshmen/sophomores), two jazz bands, a competitive marching band, and a pep band. The symphonic and concert bands rehearse daily and perform throughout the year. The marching band practices during the summer until the end of the marching season (typically mid to late October), and has taken third place in their division at state in 2014, 2015 and 2018, and second in 2019.  They also participated in the 2019 London New Year’s Day parade. Jazz Band 1 performs publicly at local parties, meetings, and other events. There are also guitar classes and piano classes.

Choral music
The Hamilton High School choir program consists of a concert choir (juniors/seniors), a cantabile choir (freshmen/sophomores), an a cappella choir, and a competitive show choir, Synergy. The concert and cantabile choirs rehearse daily and perform throughout the year. The a cappella choir also practices daily, and performs at locations around Sussex and Milwaukee, especially over the holiday season. Synergy Show Choir holds auditions in May for the following school year, and has a choreography camp at the end of July. It competes throughout the state. The choir program has expanded from a single, 30-member all female ensemble to four mixed choirs, all performing music of varying degrees of difficulty and style. They participated with the band in the London New Year’s Day parade.

Athletics
In 2007, the basketball team lost in the sectional round of the state playoffs. They made the state finals in 2018 but lost to Oshkosh North. In 2008, the football team won three playoff games, losing in the state semifinal round. In 2011 the football team was the conference champion and made it into the third round of the state playoffs in Division One.

The boys' and girls' basketball programs were both GMC conference champions in the 2012-13 season. The girls' bowling team was the district VII conference champion and placed third at state. Cheerleaders won the state championship 2019 and were WACPC state runners-up 2018. In 2010 the girls' track and field team placed second in the 4x100 relay. In 2011 it won state in the 4x200 meter relay and the 4x400 meter relay. In 2012 it placed fourth in the 4x400 meter relay, and second in the 4x200 meter relay at the state meet.

Clubs
The academic decathlon is a team competition in which students match their intellects with students from other schools. Charger Television explores filmmaking, video and audio production, animation, and broadcast journalism. The Cultural Exchange Club promotes awareness and understanding of other people and cultures by supporting exchange students. DECA is a marketing and business organization for students. Foreign language clubs offered at Hamilton include Spanish, French, and German, and students learn about the different cultures and go on field trips to learn more about and participate in them. Other clubs are yearbook, art, book group, chess, drama, student council, forensics, graphic arts, photo, show choir, and project caring. Some physically active clubs include intramural basketball, weightlifting, trap shooting club, and ski and snowboard club.

References

External links
 
Robotics
Athletics
Cross Country Profile on Athletic.net

Public high schools in Wisconsin
Greater Metro Conference
Schools in Waukesha County, Wisconsin
Educational institutions established in 1962